Parkbahn (also Standseilbahn Butzenbüel) is a funicular at Zurich Airport in Switzerland. The line leads from the "The Circle" buildings to the center of the park atop Butzenbüel. It is part of a landscaping project of the glacial moraine and planted forest. The single-car line has a length of 79 m with a maximum incline of 30% and a difference of elevation of 23 m. It is fully automated and monitored remotely from the airport's Skymetro operation center.

The installation is open to the public since November 2020.

References 
 

Parkbahn
Transport in the canton of Zürich
Kloten
Railway lines opened in 2020